Hannele Yki-Järvinen is a Finnish endocrinologist, who specialises in non-alcoholic fatty liver disease (NAFLD) and the treatment of type 2 diabetes. She is Professor of Medicine at the Department of Medicine, University of Helsinki, Finland. She is also Head of the Division of Diabetes at the Helsinki University Central Hospital. She received the 1995 Young Scientist Anders Jahre Award. She was also the recipient of the Minkowski Award in 1993. Yki-Järvinen was an assistant professor at the University of Texas from 1994 to 2000. She was then an Academy Professor at the Academy of Finland from 1995 to 2000 and from 2000 to 2005.

References

External links
 

Women endocrinologists
Diabetologists
Year of birth missing (living people)
Living people
University of Helsinki alumni
Physician-scientists
Minkowski Prize recipients
21st-century Finnish physicians
Finnish women physicians
21st-century Finnish scientists
21st-century women physicians
21st-century women scientists